The siege of Diu occurred when a combined Ottoman-Gujarati force defeated a Portuguese attempt to capture the city of Diu in 1531. The victory was partly the result of Ottoman firepower over the Portuguese besiegers deployed by Mustafa Bayram, an Ottoman expert.

Shortly before the siege they encountered roughly 800 enemy soldiers at Siyâl Bet island, engaged them in combat, and killed them all. There were 9 or 17 Portuguese killed and 120 wounded. They then sailed for Diu, but the Muslim alliance defeated them and killed 14.

Although Diu was successfully defended, victory was short-lived: Diu was blockaded and the Portuguese armada was diverted towards more exposed Gujarati cities. Ghogha, Surat, Mangrol, Somnath, Bassein, Tarapur, Kelva, Mahim, Bulsar, Agashi, Patam, Pate, and many smaller settlements were assaulted and sacked, some never recovering from the attacks.

In 1534, Sultan Bahadur of Gujarat signed a peace treaty with Governor Nuno da Cunha, granting the Portuguese the territory of Bassein, including Bombay. In 1535, the Portuguese were allowed to construct a fortress at Diu.

See also
 Siege of Diu 
 Second Siege of Diu

Notes

 Gujarati name for jackal island, one of three islands near Diu, João de Barros calls it Ilha de Bet.

References

Military history of India
Diu, India
Diu
Diu
Diu, 1531
Diu
1531 in India
1531 in the Ottoman Empire